Lou is a Southeast Admiralty Islands language spoken on Lou Island of Manus Province, Papua New Guinea by 1,000 people.

Dialects
There are three dialects. The main dialect is Rei.

Grammar
Lou has thirteen consonants and seven vowels. It is a nominative–accusative language and has subject–verb–object (SVO) word order.

References

External links
 A Lou dictionary
 Kaipuleohone archive of Robert Blust's materials include written and audio recorded materials 

Admiralty Islands languages
Languages of Manus Province